Louisiana has the fourth lowest per capita income in the United States of America, at $16,912 (2000).  Its personal per capita income is $26,100 (2003).

Louisiana parishes ranked by per capita income

Note: Data is from the 2010 United States Census Data and the 2006-2010 American Community Survey 5-Year Estimates.

References

Louisiana
Economy of Louisiana
Income